The 10th Grand Prix de Marseille was a non-championship Formula Two motor race held on 27 April 1952 at the Parc Borély in Marseille. Race distance was decided not by distance but by time, the duration being 3 hours. The race was won by pole-setter Alberto Ascari driving a Ferrari 500. B. Bira and Robert Manzon shared second place in a Simca Gordini Type 15 and Johnny Claes was third in another Type 15. Ascari's teammate Giuseppe Farina set fastest lap but failed to finish the race.

Classification

Race

References

Marseille
Marseille
Marseille